Aldo Costa (born 5 June 1961) is an Italian engineer and the Chief Technical Officer at Dallara. With 14 constructors' championships and 12 drivers' titles working for Ferrari and Mercedes, Costa is the most successful engineer and designer in F1 history.

Costa was born in Parma. After school, he continued studying and graduated from the University of Bologna in mechanical engineering. He started working at Abarth, part of the FIAT group. In 1988, after a couple of months, Costa joined Minardi focussing on the suspension, with Nigel Cowperthwaite taking care of aerodynamics. Costa followed Giacomo Caliri as technical director of the team. Costa joined the Scuderia Ferrari in 1995 and in 1998 became assistant to the team's Chief Designer, Rory Byrne. When Byrne announced his intention to retire in 2004, Costa was named as his successor. Byrne credited the design of the 2005 Ferrari to Costa.

Before the 2006 season, Costa was promoted to be the Head of Design and Development at Ferrari, as the team announced Nikolas Tombazis as their new Chief Designer. On 12 November 2007 Ferrari announced that Costa would take on the role of technical director. In May 2011, (after a very bad start to the 2011 season) Ferrari announced that Costa had relinquished his position as technical director to take on new responsibilities within the company. Pat Fry took over the role of Chief Designer at Scuderia Ferrari.

On 20 July 2011, it was announced that Costa would leave Ferrari by mutual agreement. On 30 September 2011 news surfaced that he would be joining Mercedes as Engineering Director of the team.
Costa led the design of the 2013 Mercedes AMG Petronas F1 W04 car under technical director Bob Bell.

In 2014, 2015, 2016, 2017 and 2018 he was the designer/engineering director for the world championship winning Mercedes F1 W05 Hybrid, Mercedes F1 W06 Hybrid, Mercedes F1 W07 Hybrid, Mercedes AMG F1 W08 EQ Power+ and Mercedes AMG F1 W09 EQ Power+ cars.

In July 2018 it was announced that Costa would step down from his role at the end of the season, and become an adviser. He cited a need to spend more time with his family in his native Italy. In January 2020 he joined Italian race-car constructor Dallara as chief technical officer.

Formula One World Championships

References

1961 births
Living people
Engineers from Parma
Italian automobile designers
Italian motorsport people
Ferrari people
Formula One designers
Mercedes-Benz in Formula One